A  King's Scholar is a foundation scholar (elected on the basis of good academic performance and usually qualifying for reduced fees) of one of certain public schools. These include Eton College; The King's School, Canterbury; The King's School, Worcester; Durham School; and Westminster School, although at Westminster their name changes depending on whether the current monarch is male or female (under Charles III, they are King's Scholars).

King's Scholars at Eton College

At Eton College, a King's Scholar (known as a "Colleger" or colloquially as a "tug") is one who has passed the College Election examination and has been awarded a Foundation Scholarship and admitted into a house known as "College", the premises of which are situated within the original ancient purpose-built college buildings. It is the original and oldest Eton house (strictly speaking it was established before the house system developed at Eton, for use by Oppidans) and consists solely of King's Scholars ranging in age from 13 to 18. At any one time there are about 70 King's Scholars, who are distinguished by the wearing of a black academic gown over the usual school uniform of a tail-coat. They thus represent the original core of the institution founded by King Henry VI as a charity school to provide free education to 70 poor boys who would then go on to King's College, Cambridge, founded as a sister institution by the same King in 1441. The other 1,200 boys at the school, the majority of whom pay full fees, and who appeared later in the history of the college, are known as Oppidans because they live not within the original ancient college buildings, but in boarding houses within the town (Latin: oppidum) of Eton.

The gown is said to be the basis of the traditional nickname given to Collegers of "tugs", from the Latin Gens Togata, i.e. "toga'd people".

As the college's statutes provide for 70 King's Scholars, who remain in College for five years, about 14 are admitted per year (a "block" in Eton argot), at the age of 13. They share most aspects of school life with the Oppidans, including lessons and most sport. However they eat all their meals in College Hall, which has hosted many distinguished guests in its long history including Queen Elizabeth I, and are privy to certain ancient formal traditions not practised by Oppidans. One other difference is that Collegers usually play the Wall Game in the winter term for the full five years, while Oppidans tend to play it only in their last year.

Collegers live in the original ancient central area of the school, either overlooking or in close proximity to School Yard, bounded by Eton College Chapel and Lupton's Tower, with the Founder's Statue in its centre. The boarding house in which Collegers live includes Chamber, the older section, with rooms looking into School Yard, and New Buildings, on the reverse side, which contains the majority of the boys' rooms.

Historically a Foundation Scholarship used to provide full and unconditional waiver of all the school fees, but since the 1960s the scholarship has been increasingly subjected to means testing. As of 2021 a scholarship does not affect the size of fees. However part or all of the fees may be waived, dependent on financial circumstances.

King's Scholars have the post-nominal letters KS appended to their surnames in the school lists. Oppidans who have distinguished themselves academically, but who may have elected not to become Collegers, are called Oppidan Scholars, and similarly have OS attached to their surnames in the school lists, but receive no financial benefit and are distinguished in no other way from other Oppidans.

Notable Eton King's Scholars

 James Arbuthnot (politician)
 Jasamrit Singh Rahala (television personality)
 Robert Armstrong, Baron Armstrong of Ilminster (Cabinet Secretary, popularised the phrase 'economical with the truth')
 Neal Ascherson (journalist)
 Alfred Ayer (philosopher)
 Michael Beloff (barrister)
 Eric Arthur Blair (writer usually known by his pen name, George Orwell)
 Jamie Borwick, Lord Borwick (industrialist)
 Oscar Browning (educationalist)
 James Buchan (novelist and historian)
 Henry Chadwick (theologian)
 Cyril Connolly (writer and critic)
 Armand D'Angour (classicist)
 Scrope Berdmore Davies (scholar, gambler, dandy)
 Claude Aurelius Elliott (Head Master and then Provost of Eton College)
 Ralph Dominic Gamble M.C. (army officer)
 Bamber Gascoigne (quizmaster)
 Lewis Gielgud (intelligence officer and Red Cross worker)
 Timothy Gowers FRS (Fields Medal-winning mathematician)
 J. B. S. Haldane (biologist)
 Henry Hitchings (writer)
 Douglas Hogg (3rd Viscount Hailsham, Baron Hailsham of Kettlethorpe; lawyer and politician)
 Douglas Hurd (Baron Hurd of Westwell, Foreign Secretary)
 Aldous Huxley (novelist)
 Julian Huxley (evolutionary biologist)
 Pico Iyer (novelist)
 M. R. James (writer, scholar, and provost of King's College, Cambridge, and of Eton College)
 Boris Johnson (United Kingdom prime minister)
 John Maynard Keynes (economist)
 Homi Kharas (global economist)
William King (priest)
 Kwasi Kwarteng (UK cabinet minister and historian)
 Stanley Mordaunt Leathes KCB (historian and Civil Service administrator)
 Sir George Leggatt (Justice of the High Court)
 Anthony Lloyd, Baron Lloyd of Berwick (judge)
 Constantine Louloudis (rower)
 Harold Macmillan (later 1st Earl of Stockton, Prime Minister)
 Noel Malcolm (writer)
 David Maxwell (oarsman)
 Robin Milner FRS (Computer scientist)
 Charles Moore, Baron Moore of Etchingham (journalist)
 John Paul Morrison (inventor/discoverer of Flow-based programming)
 Henry Moseley (physicist)
 Ferdinand Mount (journalist)
 Sir Roger Mynors (classical scholar)
 Sir David Natzler (Clerk of the House of Commons)
 Adam Nicolson (writer)
 Simon P. Norton (mathematician)
 Cuthbert Ottaway (first England football captain and all-round athlete)
 Raymond Paley (mathematician)
 Richard Porson (classical scholar)
 Derek Prince (Bible teacher)
 Arthur Rhys Davids D.S.O., M.C. with bar (First World War flying ace)
 Steven Runciman (historian)
 Conrad Russell (historian, politician)
 Andrew Sinclair (British novelist, historian, biographer, critic and filmmaker)
 James Kenneth Stephen (poet and suspect in the Jack the Ripper case)
 Martin Taylor (businessman)
 Frank Turner (singer-songwriter)
 Sir Robert Walpole (Prime Minister)
 Peter Warlock (composer)
 Stephen Wolfram (creator of the computer program Mathematica)
 Patrick Wormald (historian)

King's and Queen's Scholars at Westminster School

The foundation scholars at Westminster School are called Queen's Scholars when there is a reigning Queen and King's Scholars when there is a reigning King. As at Eton, they are selected by competitive examination ("The Challenge"), board at the oldest house in the school, known as College, and wear gowns during school Abbey services in Westminster Abbey.

King's Scholars at King's College Cambridge
The term King's Scholar is also used for undergraduates at King's College Cambridge who obtain first-class degrees. They receive a prize of £350, and are entitled to attend a ceremony in the King's College Chapel at which they sign their name in the King's Scholar book. A three-course formal dinner is held in the subsequent Michaelmas term, during which scholars dine for free with their respective Directors of Studies (DoS). The only time when scholars are not entitled to attend this ceremony is if they attain a first-class degree in their final year.

This is a historical hang-over from scholarships endowed by the college's founder (King's College Cambridge and Eton College were both founded by Henry VI, and are sister colleges).

King's Scholars at the King's Schools

The seven King's Schools at Canterbury, Chester, Ely, Gloucester, Peterborough, Rochester and Worcester were re-endowed or re-founded by King Henry VIII in 1541 following the Dissolution of the Monasteries, and award King's Scholarships in his name. Originally all pupils at the King's Schools were endowment-funded King's Scholars; the King's Schools now generally award the King's Scholarship in recognition of academic or musical attainment, and the Scholarship is often accompanied by a discount on school fees. By statute of Queen Elizabeth II, the King's Schools were granted the right to award Queen's Scholarships in 1973, both in recognition of the reigning Queen, and because many of the King's Schools, previously all single-sex schools, were moving towards co-education at the time.

King's Ely
King's Ely awarded King's Scholarships to 12 boys every year until 1973 when Queen Elizabeth II requested for the scholarship to be awarded to high achieving girls as well, in conjunction with her visit to the school. Thus every year 6 girls and 6 boys from the lower sixth are awarded the scholarship based on the grades achieved at GCSE with most scholars achieving over 5 A*. The ceremony is carried out in Ely Cathedral in which the Scholars are added as members of the Cathedral foundation. Every year the scholars participate in one of King's Ely's oldest traditions, the annual "Hoop Trundle". Essentially the scholars trundle hoops along the college lane in a race. The tradition derives from when centuries ago, one of the privileges of being a King's scholar was the right to be able to play games in cathedral and college grounds. King's scholars wear a red gown over their uniform and are also entitled to several other privileges:

Former scholars can marry in Ely Cathedral
Are members of the Ely Cathedral foundation for life
They can be buried within the grounds of Ely Cathedral

King's School, Canterbury
At the King's School Canterbury, King's Scholars are students who have taken the scholarship exam on entry or achieved exceptional grades in their GCSE, usually more than 9 A*. In previous years they wore gowns over their uniforms, a privilege now reserved for "purples" the heads of houses, captain and vice captain of school and head scholar. Now all academic scholars have a white gown, worn to cathedral services. This is received at a special service in the cathedral where the scholars are admitted to the society. They also gain the right to walk down the aisle at cathedral services first. Scholars do also have the right to wear scholar jumpers, which are the same as the school black ones with a white stripe around the collar and hem. Scholars are entitled to several traditional privileges:

Former KSs can marry in the crypt of Canterbury Cathedral
They can be buried within the grounds of Canterbury Cathedral

See also Kings School Canterbury#Traditions.

King's School, Worcester
At the King's School, Worcester, the King's Scholarship is the highest scholarship awarded. It is awarded on the basis of academic or musical attainment, and typically accompanies a reduction in school fees. King's Scholars are generally appointed in the Lower Remove (year 9) on the basis of exam results and an interview, or in the Lower Sixth (year 12) on the basis of attainment up to GCSE. All scholars appointed in the Lower Remove are titled King's Scholars, regardless of their gender or of the reigning monarch, in honour of Henry VIII; male scholars appointed in the Lower Sixth are also titled King's Scholars; female scholars appointed in the Lower Sixth are titled Queen's Scholars in honour of Elizabeth II. New King's Scholars are initiated into the Worcester Cathedral Foundation in the first evensong service of the academic year where they are presented to the dean and bishop of Worcester Cathedral by the headmaster of the school.

King's and Queen's Scholars are members of the foundation of Worcester Cathedral, and wear a white surplice over their uniform during major school services. The Senior Scholar, who is appointed from among the King's and Queen's Scholars in the Upper Sixth (year 13), has the job of co-ordinating the scholars. In an annual ceremony, the Senior Scholar proceeds to Worcester Crown Court, to demand from the presiding judge, in Latin, a day's holiday for the school, known as Judge's Day. He or she is entitled to be married in the cathedral and buried within the cathedral grounds, and is also theoretically entitled to graze a sheep and a goat on College Green.

References

External links 
Glossary of Eton Terms

Eton College
Scholarships in the United Kingdom